José Fernando Martínez Rodilla (born 3 March 1950 in Vigo, Galicia) is a Spanish retired footballer who played as a forward.

External links
 
 National team data at BDFutbol
 
 Celta de Vigo biography 

1950 births
Living people
Spanish footballers
Footballers from Vigo
Association football forwards
La Liga players
Segunda División players
Tercera División players
RC Celta de Vigo players
UP Langreo footballers
Real Valladolid players
CE Sabadell FC footballers
CF Reus Deportiu players
Spain under-23 international footballers
Spain international footballers
Yeclano CF players